Catel–Manzke syndrome is a rare genetic disorder characterized by distinctive abnormalities of the index fingers; the classic features of Pierre Robin syndrome; occasionally with additional physical findings.

Signs and symptoms
The clinical presentation of this condition is consistent with the following (among others):
 Highly arched eyebrow
 Joint stiffness
 Scoliosis 
 Short stature

Diagnosis

Prevalence

Currently there are only around 26 people in the world that are known to have this rare condition. Inheritance is thought to be X-linked recessive.

References

External links 

Syndromes affecting the tongue
Genetic disorders with OMIM but no gene
Skeletal disorders
Syndromes affecting the jaw
Syndromes with cleft lip and/or palate
Syndromes with dysmelia